Thomas Hay  (1733–1786) was a British Army officer and  politician who sat in the House of Commons from 1768 to 1780.

Early life and army
Hay was the eldest son of William Hay of Glyndebourne, Sussex and his wife Elizabeth Pelham, daughter of Thomas Pelham  MP  of Catsfield Place, Sussex and was born on 3 July 1733. He was educated at Westminster School in 1747. He joined the army and was Cornet in the 9th Dragoons in 1751, Lieutenant in the 7th Dragoons in 1755 and captain in 1757. He served on the raid on Cherbourg in 1758 and was in Germany, as aide-de-camp to Granby from 1759 to 1763. He became a Major in 1761 and Lieutenant-Colonel in 1765. He also studied at University of Göttingen.

Political career
In 1768 the Duke of Newcastle chose Hay as candidate for Lewes but later changed his mind. However Hay had already canvassed the town and been promised support. He was elected  Member of Parliament for Lewes in the 1768 general election. In 1774  he stood at Lewes on his own interest and was returned. He stood again in 1780 but was defeated and did not stand in 1784. There is no indication that he ever spoke in Parliament.

Later life
Hay was described by George Hardinge as “a modest, virtuous, respectable, and sensible man; with no brilliancy of talent, but with a high sense of honour”. He died unmarried on 9 February 1786.

References

1733 births
1796 deaths
British MPs 1768–1774
British MPs 1774–1780
9th Queen's Royal Lancers officers
Members of the Parliament of Great Britain for English constituencies
7th Queen's Own Hussars officers
British Army personnel of the Seven Years' War